Westworld is an American science fiction television series created by Jonathan Nolan and Lisa Joy for HBO, based on the 1973 film of the same name by Michael Crichton. The story takes place in the fictional Westworld, a technologically advanced, Western-themed amusement park populated completely by synthetic androids dubbed "hosts". The park caters to high-paying guests who may indulge their wildest fantasies within the park without fear of retaliation from the hosts, who are prevented by their programming from harming humans.

The series has been a candidate for television awards in a variety of categories recognizing its writing, acting, directing, production, score, and visual effects.

Awards and nominations

Notes

References

External links
 

Westworld
+Awards list